Tetrablemmidae, sometimes called armored spiders, is a family of tropical araneomorph spiders first described by Octavius Pickard-Cambridge in 1873. It contains 126 described species in 29 genera from southeast Asia, with a few that occur in Africa and Central and South America. Pacullidae was incorporated into this family in 1981, but was later restored as a separate family in a 2016 phylogenetic study.

Most species have been collected from litter and soil, including that of epiphytes. Some live in caves and show typical adaptations of cave spiders, such as loss of eyes and weak sclerotization. Members of Tetrablemma only have four eyes, a trait in spiders only found in these and certain members of Caponiidae.

Genera

, the World Spider Catalog accepts the following genera:

Ablemma Roewer, 1963 — Papua New Guinea, Asia
Afroblemma Lehtinen, 1981 — Angola, Tanzania, Congo
Anansia Lehtinen, 1981 — Angola
Bacillemma Deeleman-Reinhold, 1993 — Thailand
Borneomma Deeleman-Reinhold, 1980 — Indonesia
Brignoliella Shear, 1978 — Asia, Oceania
Caraimatta Lehtinen, 1981 — Mexico, Caribbean, Central America
Choiroblemma Bourne, 1980 — India
Cuangoblemma Brignoli, 1974 — Angola
Fallablemma Shear, 1978 — Samoa, Indonesia
Gunasekara Lehtinen, 1981 — Sri Lanka
Hexablemma Berland, 1920 — Kenya
Indicoblemma Bourne, 1980 — China, Thailand, India
Lehtinenia Tong & Li, 2008 — China
Maijana Lehtinen, 1981 — Indonesia
Mariblemma Lehtinen, 1981 — Seychelles
Matta Crosby, 1934 — Brazil, Mexico
Micromatta Lehtinen, 1981 — Belize
Monoblemma Gertsch, 1941 — South America, Madagascar, Panama
Pahanga Shear, 1979 — Malaysia, Sri Lanka, Indonesia
Rhinoblemma Lehtinen, 1981 — Caroline Is.
Shearella Lehtinen, 1981 — India, Sri Lanka, China
Sinamma Lin & Li, 2014 — China
Singalangia Lehtinen, 1981 — Indonesia
Singaporemma Shear, 1978 — Asia
Sulaimania Lehtinen, 1981 — Singapore, Malaysia
Tetrablemma O. Pickard-Cambridge, 1873 — Oceania, Africa, Asia, Trinidad

Extinct genera 

 †Balticoblemma Wunderlich 2004 Bitterfeld, Baltic amber, Eocene
 †Bicornoculus Wunderlich 2015 Burmese amber, Myanmar, Cenomanian
 †Brignoliblemma Wunderlich 2017 Burmese amber, Myanmar, Cenomanian
 †Cymbioblemma Wunderlich 2017 Burmese amber, Myanmar, Cenomanian
 †Electroblemma Selden et al. 2016 Burmese amber, Myanmar, Cenomanian
 †Eogamasomorpha Wunderlich 2008 Burmese amber, Myanmar, Cenomanian
 †Longissithorax Wunderlich 2017 Burmese amber, Myanmar, Cenomanian
 †Longithorax Wunderlich 2017 Burmese amber, Myanmar, Cenomanian
 †Palpalpaculla Wunderlich 2017 Burmese amber, Myanmar, Cenomanian
 †Saetosoma Wunderlich 2012 Burmese amber, Myanmar, Cenomanian
 †Uniscutosoma Wunderlich 2015 Burmese amber, Myanmar, Cenomanian

See also
 List of Tetrablemmidae species

References

External links

Tetrablemmidae Armoured Spiders Tetrablemmidae at arachne.org.au

 
Araneomorphae families
Taxa named by Octavius Pickard-Cambridge